Manchenahalli  is a town in the southern state of Karnataka, India. On 31 October 2019, the chief minister of Karnataka state, Shree B S Yediyurappa promoted Manchenahalli as Taluk. It is located in the Gauribidanur taluk of Chikkaballapur district in Karnataka. It is located 14 km from the town of Gowribidanur and 10 km from Muddenahalli-Kanivenarayanapura. The town houses a Jain shrine called Manchenahalli Jain Temple devoted to Shri Kodi Brahmadeva, Also a dam is attached to this temple. A tourist hub is located in nearby Minikanagurki. Also it's near to Srinivasasagara

Demographics
 India census, Manchenahalli had a population of 7205 with 3657 males and 3548 females.

See also
 Chickballapur
 Districts of Karnataka

References

External links
 http://Kolar.nic.in/

Villages in Kolar district